James Francis Doughan is an American actor, teacher and writer. He is best known for his roles as Detective Doyle in The Mask (1994) and Detective Allen as well as the voice of Lucky the Cat in Stuart Little (1999) and the head coach for the soccer team Stuart and his human brother, George Little, play for in  Stuart Little 2 (2002). He is currently a performing arts teacher at Harvard-Westlake School in Los Angeles, California.

Career
Doughan has been working as a professional actor and writer since 1981 in theatre, film, and television. He was a resident company member for the Dudley Rigg’s Brave New Workshop in Minneapolis from 1981 to 1985, and the Los Angeles comedy theater The Groundlings from 1985 to 1993. He has appeared in The Flintstones, The Mask, Stuart Little, Stuart Little 2, The Haunted Mansion, Evan Almighty, and Hotel for Dogs, in addition to guest appearances in several television series. Before becoming a performing arts teacher at Harvard-Westlake School  Doughan taught History, English and Drama at the Westridge School in Pasadena, California. He has been a mentor for student writers, and a director for the Harvard-Westlake School Playwright’s Workshop. He has also taught at the Harvard-Westlake School Summer Intensive Actor’s Workshop and an improvisation master class at the USC Marshall School of Business.

Education
Doughan attended Apple Valley High School in Apple Valley, Minnesota and graduated in 1977. He also attended the University of Minnesota Duluth, where he received his BFA degree in theatre.

Personal life
Doughan married Kate Benton in 1988. Benton is an actress and writer who was also a member of The Groundlings. Benton also works as a teacher at the Harvard-Westlake School.

Filmography

Film

Television

References

External links
 

Living people
20th-century American male actors
21st-century American male actors
American male film actors
American male television actors
American male voice actors
American male stage actors
American male writers
Schoolteachers from Minnesota
Schoolteachers from California
Drama teachers
Male actors from Minneapolis
Male actors from Saint Paul, Minnesota
Male actors from California
Male actors from Los Angeles
Writers from Minneapolis
Writers from Saint Paul, Minnesota
Writers from Los Angeles
Writers from Pasadena, California
People from Apple Valley, Minnesota
University of Minnesota Duluth alumni
Apple Valley High School (Minnesota) alumni
Year of birth missing (living people)